This is a list of euphemisms for death and dying in the English language.

A euphemism is a common word or phrase intended to soften the harshness of a literal meaning. For example, most English speakers would understand the phrase "kick the bucket" to mean "to die," as well as to actually kick a bucket. Furthermore, they would understand when each meaning is being used in context. A euphemism is not to be confused with other figures of speech such as a metaphor, which invokes an image by use of implicit comparisons (e.g., "the man of steel" ); a simile, which invokes an image by use of explicit comparisons (e.g., "faster than a speeding bullet"); and hyperbole, which exaggerates an image beyond truthfulness (e.g., like "missed by a mile" ). Euphemisms are also not to be confused with proverbs, which are simple sayings that express a truth based on common sense or practical experience.

A list of euphemisms for death in the English language, most of which are usually used in the past tense:

Passed on, croaked, kicked the bucket, gone to heaven, gone home, expired, breathed his last, succumbed, left us, passed to his eternal reward, lost, met his maker, wasted, checked out, eternal rest, laid to rest, pushing up daisies, called home, was a goner, came to an end, bit the dust, annihilated, liquidated, terminated, gave up the ghost, left this world, rubbed out, snuffed it, six feet under, consumed, found everlasting peace, went to a new life, in the great beyond, no longer with us, made the change, got murdalized, on the other side, God took him, departed, transcended, bought the farm, with the angels, feeling no pain, lost the race, time was up, cashed in, crossed over Jordan, perished, lost it, was done in, translated into glory, returned to dust, withered away, in the arms, gave it up, it was curtains, a long sleep, on the heavenly shores, out of his/her misery, ended it all, angels carried him away, resting in peace, changed form, dropped the body, rode into the sunset, that was all she wrote, withdrew to more favorable frontiers.

See also

 List of idioms in the English language

Further reading 
Wiktionary's category of death-related euphemisms.

Eng
Lists of English phrases
Euphemisms

References